Claire Désert (born 1967) is a French classical pianist.

Biography 
Born in Angoulême, Désert began learning the piano at the age of five. At fourteen, she joined the Conservatoire de Paris (CNSMDP). A student of French composer Jean Hubeau, she won the First prize for chamber music.

In 1985, she was unanimously awarded the first piano prize by the jury. She then enrolled in the class of the Bulgarian pianist Ventsislav Yankov. In the same year, she was admitted into the piano improvement cycle. She obtained a scholarship from the French government and went to study for one year at the Tchaïkovski Conservatory of Moscow, in the class of Yevgeny Malinin. Back in France, she joined the class of cellist Roland Pidoux and further perfected her chamber music skills.

Career 

In 1997, she was named "New Talent of the Year" at the Victoires de la musique classique for her performance of the Czech composer Antonín Dvořák's and the Russian pianist and composer Alexander Scriabin's concertos, with the Orchestre Philharmonique de Strasbourg.

Désert is also a professor of piano at the Conservatoire de Paris

Collaborations 
As a soloist, she regularly accompanies renowned symphonic formations such as the Orchestre philharmonique de Radio France, the Orchestre philharmonique de Strasbourg, the Orchestre philharmonique de Paris, the Orchestre national de Lille, the Orchestre symphonique de Québec and the Orchestre national d'Île-de-France.

Discography

Personal albums 
 2007: Robert Schumann's Davidbünderltänze Op 6, Mirare
 2010: Robert Schumann's Abendmusik, Mirare

Collaborations 
 1999: Œuvres pour piano à quatre mains : Variations (8) / Op.35 - Allegro / op.144 'Lebensstürme'... by Franz Schubert with Claire Désert and Emmanuel Strosser, Aria Music
 2000: Musique de chambre by Elliott Carter with Patrick Gallois, Michel Lethiec, Arto Noras, Gérard Poulet and Amaury Wallez, Arion
 2000: Saint-Saëns's The Carnival of the Animals with Francis Blanche, Vincent Coq, Claire Désert, Philippe Meyer, Raphaël Pidoux and Léa Weber.
 2001: Quintette pour piano et vents - Ma mère l'Oye by Maurice Ravel and André Caplet, Claire Désert and the Moragues wind quintet, Le Chant du Monde
 2001: Cello Concerto in A minor by Robert Schumann with Anne Gastinel and Louis Langrée (conductor), Valois
 2002: Les Œuvres pour flûte by Albert Roussel with Mathieu Dufour, Adrienne Krausz, Michel Moraguez, Julie Palloc, Sandrine Piau and the Moraguès Wind Quartet, Saphir
 2004: Duos pour piano by Johannes Brahms and Franz Schubert with Emmanuel Strosser, Virgin Classics
 2005: Arpeggione by Franz Schubert, with Anne Gastinel, Naïve
 2005: Piano Quartets, compositions by Alexis de Castillon, Camille Saint-Saëns, Ernest Chausson and Guillaume Lekeu with the Kandinsky quartet, Virgin Classics
 2005: In the shade of forests, compositions by George Enescu, Maurice Ravel and Claude Debussy with Claire Désert and Philippe Graffin, Avie
 2005: Mendelssohn Bartholdy's Songs Without Words with Claire Désert and David Walter, Polymnie
 2007: Danses slaves, Op 46 and Op 72 by Antonín Dvořák with Claire Désert and Emmanuel Strosser, Mirare
 2007: Mozart's 3 préludes pfor piano - 3 strophes sur le nom de Sacher - Dutilleux's Ainsi la nuit with Claire Désert, Desmons, Hery, Perraud, Erol
 2008: Arpeggione by Franz Schubert, Claire Désert, Anne Gastinel, Édition collector naïve 10 ans
 2013: L'enfance - Piano à 4 mains with Claire Désert and Emmanuel Strosser, Mirare
 2013: Moments musicaux - Pieces for Paul Klee - Suonare - All ungarese by Bruno Mantovani with Claire Désert and the Trio Wanderer, Mirare
 2015: Œuvres pour piano à 4 mains by Franz Schubert, Claire Désert, Emmanuel Strosser, Mirare
 2017: Brahms: Cello Sonatas with Claire Désert and Gary Hoffman, La Dolce Vota

Compilations 
 2006: Anne Gastinel - Coffret 3Cds, compositions by Johannes Brahms, Robert Schumann and Franz Schubert with Claire Désert, Anne Gastinel, François-Frédéric Guy, Louis Langrée (conductor) and the Orchestre Philharmonique de Liège, Naïve
 2007: Classique et Zen, Classical compilation with Rinaldo Alessandrini, Lise de la Salle, Claire Désert, Anne Gastinel, Howard Griffiths, François-Frédéric Guy, Laurence Equilbey, Sara Mingardo, Fazıl Say, Grigory Sokolov, Naïve
 2010: Complete chamber music with winds by Francis Poulenc, Compilation Classique with Berrod, Claire Désert, Emmanuel Strosser, Trenel and the Orchestre des solistes de Paris, Indesens

Live recordings 
 2005: Stabat Mater by Bruno Coulais, live recording with Loïc Pierre (conductor), le Choeur de Chambre Mikrokosmos, Guillaume Depardieu, Claire Désert, Marie Kobayashi, Laurent Korcia, Robert Wyatt, Naïve
 2006: Recordings of the piano Festival de La Roque-d'Anthéron with Nicholas Angelich, Iddo Bar-Shaï, Boris Berezovsky, Claire Désert, Brigitte Engerer, Philippe Giusiano, Jean-Frédéric Neuburger, Anne Queffélec, Emmanuel Strosser, Édition limitée, Mirare
 2007: Recordings of the La Roque-d'Anthéron piano festival, volume 2, with Nicholas Angelich, Iddo Bar-Shaï, Boris Berezovsky, Claire Désert, Shani Diluka, Philippe Giusiano, Anne Queffélec, Jean-Frederic Neuburger, Emmanuel Strosser, Mirare

References

External links 
 Interview of Claire Désert on Classicagenda

1967 births
Living people
People from Angoulême
21st-century French women classical pianists
Conservatoire de Paris alumni
Academic staff of the Conservatoire de Paris
Chevaliers of the Ordre des Arts et des Lettres
Women music educators